Pickerington High School North is a public high school in Pickerington, Ohio. It is one of two high schools in the Pickerington Local School District. In the city of Pickerington, it is referred to simply as "North" and their mascot is the Panther.
In 2002, "Pickerington High School" split into two high schools, Pickerington High School Central and Pickerington High School North. Pickerington High School North opened on August 24, 2003.

Athletics

The school's sports programs include football, boys basketball, girls basketball, wrestling, boys tennis, girls tennis, boys soccer, girls soccer, boys golf, girls golf, cross country, cheerleading, track and field, Boys Volleyball, Girls Volleyball, baseball, softball, marching band, and orchestra.

Ohio High School Athletic Association State Championships
 Baseball – 2016
 Girls Bowling – 2012 (Brittany Beeghley - state singles champion)
 Boys Track and Field – 2015, 2020

Pickerington North Band Program
The Pickerington North High School Band program has over 140 wind and percussion members who participate in various performing groups including the Pickerington High School North Marching band coined "The Marching Panthers". Other groups including the OMEA Class AA Symphonic Band, Class B Concert Band I, and Class C Concert Band II. The Pickerington North Band is directed by Gregory Benson and assistant directors Chris Carmean and Matthew Guerrieri

The Pickerington North Band has served much success in its 19 year history including the following:

Marching Band
OMEA State Marching Band Finals Qualifier - 2003-2021
OMEA State Marching Band Finals Superior Ratings - 2004-2021
BOA (Bands of America) Central Ohio Bronze Medalists - 2019
Yearly performances at the Ohio State University Buckeye Invitational
2003 Nations Parade, New York, NY
2005 Festival Disney Parade Marching National Champions, Orlando, FL
2005 Festival Disney Indoor Guard National Champions, Orlando, FL
2006 Tournament of Roses Parade, Pasadena, CA
2007 Fiesta Bowl Parade & National Band Championship, Phoenix, AZ - First Place Parade Marching (Class B)
2009 Citrus Parade, Orlando, FL
2011 NYC Veterans Day Parade, New York, NY
2013 Fiesta Bowl Parade, Phoenix, AZ - Grand Champion
2018 London New Year's Day Parade
2019 Tournament of Roses Parade
2021 Festival Disney Parade Marching National Champions, Orlando, FL

Symphonic Band
OMEA State Concert Band Qualifier - 2004-2007, 2009-2022
OMEA State Concert Band Superior Ratings - 2005, 2009-2022
2014 PHSN Symphonic Band Performance at the Capital University Wind Band Invitational and Reading Clinic
2016 PHSN Symphonic Band Performance at the OMEA Professional Development Conference
2019 PHSN Symphonic Band Performance at the Capital University Band Festival, with Guest Composer, John Mackey

Concert Band I
OMEA State Concert Band Qualifier - 2007-2010, 2012-2022
OMEA State Concert Band Superior Ratings - 2009, 2010, 2012, 2014-2022

Concert Band II
OMEA State Concert Band Qualifier - 2010, 2011, 2014-2021
OMEA State Concert Band Superior Ratings - 2017, 2018

Controversy
A number of notable incidents of racism have occurred at Pickerington High School North, including two students (one black and one white) who appeared having "former slave" and "former slave owner," respectively, painted on their backs during a football game in 2014, a student who appeared in blackface captioning herself as "#n***amegan" on Snapchat in 2016, and yet another student appeared dressed as a member of the Ku Klux Klan in a Snapchat in 2016. The latter two incidents spurred a "cultural-sensitivity training" session. However, in 2020, a school assembly which discussed police brutality and violence against Black people during Black History Month caused a number of parents of white students at the school to complain that the program was "politically charged."

Later, in June 2020, the Pickerington Local School District (PLSD) released a statement which noted continuing work to "[c]reate periodic open public forums in which all individuals are encouraged to freely discuss cultural, racial, and ethnicity issues that can provide insight and improve our ability to work together as a community."

Notable alumni
Justin Boren, retired NFL Offensive Lineman
Jake Butt, retired NFL Tight end
Pat Elflein, Carolina Panthers Offensive Lineman
Godwin Igwebuike, Detroit Lions running back
Jack Sawyer, Defensive End for Ohio State University

References

External links
 District Website
 Athletic Program Website

Educational institutions established in 2003
High schools in Fairfield County, Ohio
Public high schools in Ohio
2003 establishments in Ohio